'71 Er Ma Jononi is a 2014 Bangladeshi drama film directed by Shah Alam Kiron, and starring Nipun Akter. The film is centered on the 1971 Bangladesh War of Independence.  Chitralekha Guho was awarded Best Supporting Actress at the 39th Bangladesh National Film Awards.

Soundtrack

Awards 
39th Bangladesh National Film Awards
 Winner: Best Supporting Actress - Chitralekha Guha

References

External links 
 

2014 films
Films scored by Shujeo Shyam
Bengali-language Bangladeshi films
Films scored by Emon Saha
Films based on the Bangladesh Liberation War
2010s Bengali-language films
Government of Bangladesh grants films